Joaquín Dualde Santos de Lamadrid (14 November 1932 in Barcelona – 28 April 2012) was a Spanish field hockey player who competed in the 1960 Summer Olympics. His younger brother Eduardo Dualde and cousin Ignacio Macaya were also international hockey players.

References

External links
 

1932 births
2012 deaths
Spanish male field hockey players
Olympic field hockey players of Spain
Field hockey players at the 1960 Summer Olympics
Olympic bronze medalists for Spain
Olympic medalists in field hockey
Field hockey players from Barcelona
Medalists at the 1960 Summer Olympics